Christian Jaksjø (born 18 December 1973 in Oslo, Norway) is a Norwegian jazz musician (trombone and euphonium) and composer, mostly jazz where he since 1999 has been part of Bob Brookmeyer «New Art Orchestra» releasing the album New Works (1999, this years jazz album in England).

Biography 
Jaksjø was recipient of the soloist award at the big band festival in Imatra, Finland 1992. He studied music on the jazz program at Trondheim Musikkonservatorium
(1992–96)  where was the leader of Kjellerbandet for a period. He later studied composition at the Norwegian Academy of Music (1996–99) and composed music for the Danmarks Radio Storband.

Jaksjø has also appeared nationally, as in Magni Wentzel Sextet, Søyr,
Geir Lysne Listening ensemble, Oslo Groove Company. He is a teacher of trombone at the Norwegian Academy of Music, as well as a composer in the 'Ny Musikk' group (2006).

Discography 

With Oslo Groove Company
1992: Anno 1992 (Groove]
1996: Live anno 1996 (Groove)

With Jens Wendelboe
1997: Strolling With The Groove (Rosa)

Ansgar Striepens/Ed Partyka
1998: Tunnel Vision - Music for Jazz Orchestra (Mons)
2002: Dreams and Realities (Laika)

With La Descarga
1998: Descongelate (Chicken Farm)

With Bob Brookmeyer New Art Orchestra
1999: New Works (Challenge)
2000: Madly Loving You (Challenge), with the Ed Partyka Jazz Orchestra
2003: Get Well Soon (Challenge)

With Geir Lysne Listening Ensemble
2000: Aurora Borealis (Groove)
2003: Korall (ACT Music)

With The Magni Wentzel Sextet
2001: Porgy & Bess (Hot Club Records)
 
With Søyr
2001: Alene Hjemme (Curling Legs)

With Solveig Slettahjell Slow Motion Orchestra
2001: Live Fra Blå (Curling Legs)

With Lackner Jazz Orchestra
2004: Awakening Marko (Double-Moon)

References

External links 

20th-century Norwegian trombonists
21st-century Norwegian trombonists
Norwegian jazz trombonists
Male trombonists
Norwegian jazz composers
Male jazz composers
Musicians from Oslo
1973 births
Living people
21st-century trombonists
20th-century Norwegian male musicians
21st-century Norwegian male musicians
Søyr members
Geir Lysne Listening Ensemble members
Oslo Groove Company members